Sedan is an unincorporated community located in Union County, New Mexico, United States. Sedan has a post office with ZIP code 88436.

The community was named after Sedan, Kansas, the native home of a large share of the first settlers.

References

Unincorporated communities in Union County, New Mexico
Unincorporated communities in New Mexico